Edward McConville "Eric" Stevenson (25 December 1942 – 18 May 2017) was a Scottish footballer, who played for Hearts, Hibernian and Ayr United.

Stevenson died on the morning of 18 May 2017 from cancer.

References

Sources 
 Eric Stevenson, www.ihibs.co.uk
 

1942 births
2017 deaths
Footballers from North Lanarkshire
Sportspeople from Midlothian
Association football wingers
Scottish footballers
Heart of Midlothian F.C. players
Hibernian F.C. players
Ayr United F.C. players
Scottish Football League players
Scottish Football League representative players